Collin Duel is an American politician who has served as the Oklahoma House of Representatives member from the 31st district since November 16, 2022.

Early life and education
Collin Duel was born and raised in Guthrie, Oklahoma where he attended Guthrie High School. After his military career, he earned his bachelor's degree from the University of Oklahoma in International Security Studies and his juris doctor from the University of Oklahoma College of Law.

Career

Military career 
Duel enlisted in the United States Army at age 19.
He was an Army Ranger and served four deployments in the War in Afghanistan and was honorably discharged in 2013.
During his service he was awarded two Army Commendation medals and he was discharged at the rank of sergeant.

Legal career
He graduated from the University of Oklahoma College of Law in 2019 and started his own practice, Duel Law.

Oklahoma House of Representatives
Duel officially launched his campaign for the Oklahoma House of Representatives 31st district in August 2021. Two other candidates, Logan Trainer and Karmin Grider, also launched campaigns in the district to succeed retiring incumbent Garry Mize. He advanced to a runoff with Grider. He was supported by the Oklahoma Farm Bureau in both primary elections and endorsed by Governor Kevin Stitt in the Republican runoff election. Duel defeated Grider in the runoff and won the seat since no non-Republican candidate filed for the district. He was sworn in November 16, 2022.

Personal life
He is married to his wife Hannah. They have two children together. He is a lifetime member of the National Rifle Association. He and his family attends Life Church.

References

21st-century American politicians
Christians from Oklahoma
Living people
Military personnel from Oklahoma
Oklahoma lawyers
Republican Party members of the Oklahoma House of Representatives
United States Army personnel of the War in Afghanistan (2001–2021)
Year of birth missing (living people)